Psychology and Psychotherapy: Theory, Research and Practice is a quarterly peer-reviewed medical journal covering research, assessment and treatment of psychopathologies. It is published by Wiley-Blackwell on behalf of the British Psychological Society and the editors-in-chief are Katherine Berry and Sandra Bucci (University of Manchester). It was established in 1920 as The British Journal of Medical Psychology.

Abstracting and indexing
The journal is abstracted and indexed in:

According to the Journal Citation Reports, the journal has a 2018 impact factor of 2.244.

References

External links

Quarterly journals
English-language journals
Publications established in 1920
Psychotherapy journals
British Psychological Society academic journals
Wiley-Blackwell academic journals